Mark R. Frostad (born January 19, 1949) is a Canadian thoroughbred horse trainer. Born in Brantford, Ontario, he grew up with a father who owned a stud farm but before becoming involved in thoroughbred horse racing, Frostad obtained a BA degree in literature from Princeton University then in 1976 an MBA degree from the University of Western Ontario in London, Ontario,.

In 1991 he became actively involved in racing as a thoroughbred trainer, meeting with great success in the employ of Sam-Son Farm whom he joined in 1995. Among his more than 100 stakes race victories, he won Canada's most prestigious horse race, the Queen's Plate, in 1996, 2000, 2001 and 2009 and both the Canadian International Stakes and the Breeders' Cup Turf in 1997. Mark has also had great success in both the second and third legs of the Canadian Triple Crown winning the Prince of Wales Stakes, three times (1994, 1997, 2000) and the Breeders' Stakes on four occasions (1995, 1996, 2002, 2012).

Frostad has won the Sovereign Award for Outstanding Trainer three times. His significant horses include Quiet Resolve, Chief Bearhart, and Soaring Free, all winners of the Sovereign Award for Canadian Horse of the Year.

Mark Frostad has served as president of the Canadian Horse Society and as a member of the board of directors of Woodbine Entertainment Group, operators of Woodbine Racetrack.

Mark Frostad has a wife, Pam Frostad, and three children, Kate, Justine, and Peter.

References
 Mark Frostad at the NTRA
 Mark Frostad's biography at Keeneland.com
 

1949 births
Living people
Canadian horse trainers
Canadian Horse Racing Hall of Fame inductees
Sportspeople from Brantford
Princeton University alumni
University of Western Ontario alumni
Canadian people of Norwegian descent